Xiong Yang was the fifth viscount of the state of Chu during the early Zhou Dynasty (1046–256 BC) of ancient China.  Like other early Chu rulers, he held the hereditary noble rank of viscount first granted to his great-grandfather Xiong Yi by King Cheng of Zhou.  Xiong Yang was the younger son of Xiong Dan and succeeded his older brother Xiong Sheng.  He was succeeded by his son Xiong Qu.

References

Monarchs of Chu (state)
Year of birth unknown
Year of death unknown